This is a list of the Baltic records in athletics. These are the best results in athletics by athletes representing one of the Baltic countries:

Outdoor

Key to tables:

+ = en route to a longer distance

h = hand timing

# = not ratified by national federation

WB = World Best

OT = oversized track (> 200m in circumference)

Men

Women

Mixed

Indoor

Men

Women

See also
List of Estonian records in athletics
List of Latvian records in athletics
List of Lithuanian records in athletics
List of Baltic records in swimming

References

External links
 EKJL web site 
 Estonian Athletics Records 
 Latvian Athletics Records
 LLAF web site 

Baltic
Records
Records
Records
Athletics records